
 

Willanowie Creek is an  intermittent and endorheic stream in the Australian state of South Australia that is located at 32°58'45.1"S 138°58'27.5"E, south of Ucolta.

The area is arid and the former town of Lancelot was built on the creek at the point at the Barrier Highway crossing. No sign of the town remains above the ground surface today.

References

Rivers of South Australia